"Lift Me Up" is the first single from The Wrong Side of Heaven and the Righteous Side of Hell, Volume 1, the fourth studio album from Five Finger Death Punch, and is the fifteenth single overall from the band.  The song features Rob Halford, lead vocalist for Judas Priest.  Halford joined the band at the Revolver Golden Gods Awards on May 2, 2013 to premiere the tune, with lead singer Ivan Moody referring to himself as being "the guest (vocalist)" on the song.

The song was number one in the Internet music app Spotify in its first week of release over pop songs from Mariah Carey, Daft Punk, Fergie, and others. The list represents the most viral tracks on Spotify based on the number of people who shared it divided by the number who listened to it from Monday, May 13, to Sunday, May 19, via Facebook, Tumblr, Twitter and Spotify.

In April 2014, the song won a Revolver Golden Gods Award for "Song of the Year."

Meaning 
According to Moody, the composition was about overcoming routine roadblocks and less-than-ideal circumstances in life.  He then goes on to say that while most of us weren't born into wealth, if life deals you a bad hand, you still have to play with the cards that life deals you. Moody closes by stating that the song is intended to inspire and that if you play your hand right, you might still come out on top.

Video 
The song begins with Moody singing the first verse along with the chorus, followed by Halford singing the second verse and the two of them singing the final refrain.  The current lyric video features dark skies, lightning as well as microorganisms attacking one another.

Personnel 
 Zoltan Bathory – rhythm guitar
 Jason Hook – lead guitar, backing vocals
 Ivan Moody – lead vocals
 Chris Kael – bass, backing vocals
 Jeremy Spencer – drums
 Rob Halford – guest vocals

Charts

Weekly charts

Year-end charts

References

External links
  Live performance

Five Finger Death Punch songs
2013 singles
2013 songs
Songs written by Kevin Churko
Songs written by Zoltan Bathory
Songs written by Ivan Moody (vocalist)
Songs written by Jason Hook
Songs written by Jeremy Spencer (drummer)